Vikaspuri is an MIG residential area in West Delhi, India. It is home to a few notable figures.

Notable people
 Virat Kohli, Former Captain of Indian Cricket Team
 Daler Mehndi, singer
 Shikhar Dhawan, cricketer
 Millind Gaba, singer
 Aastha Gill, singer

See also 
 South West Delhi
 West Delhi

References

Cities and towns in West Delhi district
West Delhi district
Delhi Legislative Assembly
Neighbourhoods in Delhi